21st Congress may refer to:
21st Congress of the Communist Party of the Soviet Union (1959)
21st Nur Otan Extraordinary Congress (2022)
21st United States Congress (1829–1831)